Kohar Kalan is a village in Shahkot in Jalandhar district of Punjab State, India. Kalan is Persian language word which means Big and Khurd is Persian word which means small when two villages have same name then it is distinguished as Kalan means Big and Khurd means Small with Village Name. The village is administrated by a sarpanch who is an elected representative of village as per Panchayati raj (India).

Transport 
Shahkot Malisian station is the nearest train station.

References 

Villages in Jalandhar district